Antennaria alpina (alpine pussytoes or alpine catsfoot or alpine everlasting) is a European and North American species of plant in the family Asteraceae. Antennaria alpina is native to mountainous and subarctic regions of Scandinavia, Greenland, Alaska, and the Canadian Arctic, extending south at high altitudes in mountains in the Rocky Mountains south to Montana and Wyoming.

Antennaria alpina is a perennial, herbaceous plant growing to 15 cm tall, with off-white to pinkish flowerheads 4–8 mm in diameter, produced in clusters of three to five together.

References

External links
Den virtuaella floran,  Naturhistoriska riksmuseet, Stockholm, Fjällkattfot Antennaria alpina (L.) Gaertn. in Swedish with photos 
Nordaflora, Fjellkattefot Antennaria alpina (L.) Gaertn.  in Swedish with photos 
Ian McLaren;s Arctic Flowers, Antennaria alpina
Turner Photographics, Wildflowers of the Pacific Northwest, Antennaria alpina
Electronic Atlas of the Flora of British Columbia, Antennaria alpina

alpina
Plants described in 1753
Taxa named by Carl Linnaeus
Alpine flora
Flora of Europe
Flora of Greenland
Flora of Subarctic America
Flora of Canada
Flora of the Northwestern United States